Sergei Parajanov (January 9, 1924 – July 20, 1990) was an Armenian filmmaker. Parajanov is regarded by film critics, film historians and filmmakers to be one of the greatest and most influential filmmakers in cinema history.

He invented his own cinematic style, which was out of step with the guiding principles of socialist realism; the only sanctioned art style in the USSR. This, combined with his lifestyle and behaviour, led Soviet authorities to repeatedly persecute and imprison him, and suppress his films. Despite this, Parajanov was named one of the 20 Film Directors of the Future by the Rotterdam International Film Festival, and his films were ranked among the greatest films of all time by the British Film Institute's magazine Sight & Sound.

Although he started professional film-making in 1954, Parajanov later disowned all the films he made before 1965 as "garbage". After directing Shadows of Forgotten Ancestors (renamed Wild Horses of Fire for most foreign distributions) Parajanov became something of an international celebrity and simultaneously a target of attacks from the USSR. Nearly all of his film projects and plans from 1965 to 1973 were banned, scrapped or closed by the Soviet film administrations, both local (in Kyiv and Yerevan) and federal (Goskino), almost without discussion, until he was finally arrested in late 1973 on false charges of rape, homosexuality and bribery. He was imprisoned until 1977, despite pleas for pardon from various artists. Even after his release (he was arrested for the third and last time in 1982) he was a persona non grata in Soviet cinema. It was not until the mid-1980s, when the political climate started to relax, that he could resume directing. Still, it required the help of influential Georgian actor Dodo Abashidze and other friends to have his last feature films greenlighted. His health seriously weakened after four years in labor camps and nine months in prison in Tbilisi. Parajanov died of lung cancer in 1990, at a time when, after almost 20 years of suppression, his films were being featured at foreign film festivals. In a 1988 interview he stated that, "Everyone knows that I have three Motherlands. I was born in Georgia, worked in Ukraine and I'm going to die in Armenia." Parajanov is buried at Komitas Pantheon in Yerevan.

Parajanov's films won prizes at Mar del Plata Film Festival, Istanbul International Film Festival, Nika Awards, Rotterdam International Film Festival, Sitges - Catalan International Film Festival, São Paulo International Film Festival and others. A comprehensive retrospective in the UK took place in 2010 at BFI Southbank. The retrospective was curated by Layla Alexander-Garrett and Parajanov specialist Elisabetta Fabrizi who commissioned a Parajanov-inspired new commission in the BFI Gallery by contemporary artist Matt Collishaw ('Retrospectre'). A symposium was dedicated to Paradjanov's work bringing together experts to discuss and celebrate the director's contribution to cinema and art.

Early life and films

Parajanov was born Sarkis Hovsepi Parajaniants (Սարգիս Հովսեփի Փարաջանյանց) to artistically-gifted Armenian parents, Iosif Paradjanov and Siranush Bejanova, in Tbilisi, Georgia; however, the family name of Parajaniants is attested by a surviving historical document at the Serhii Parajanov Museum in Yerevan. He gained access to art from an early age. In 1945, he traveled to Moscow, enrolled in the directing department at the VGIK, one of the oldest and highly respected film schools in Europe, and studied under the tutelage of directors Igor Savchenko and Oleksandr Dovzhenko.

In 1948 he was convicted of homosexual acts (which were illegal at the time in the Soviet Union) with an MGB officer named Nikolai Mikava in Tbilisi. These charges were later proven false. He was sentenced to five years in prison, but was released under an amnesty after three months. In video interviews, friends and relatives contest the truthfulness of anything he was charged with. They speculate the punishment may have been a form of political retaliation for his rebellious views.

In 1950 Parajanov married his first wife, Nigyar Kerimova, in Moscow. She came from a Muslim Tatar family and converted to Eastern Orthodox Christianity to marry Parajanov. She was later murdered by her relatives because of her conversion. After her murder Parajanov left Russia for Kyiv, Ukraine, where he produced a few documentaries (Dumka, Golden Hands, Natalia Uzhvy) and a handful of narrative films: Andriesh (based on a fairy tale by the Moldovan writer Emilian Bukov), The Top Guy (a kolkhoz musical), Ukrainian Rhapsody (a wartime melodrama), and Flower on the Stone (about a religious cult infiltrating a mining town in the Donets Basin). He became fluent in Ukrainian and married his second wife, Svitlana Ivanivna Shcherbatiuk (1938-2020), also known as Svetlana Sherbatiuk or Svetlana Parajanova, in 1956. Shcherbatiuk gave birth to a son, Suren, in 1958. The couple eventually divorced and she and Suren relocated to Kyiv, Ukraine.

Break from Soviet Realism

Andrey Tarkovsky's first film, Ivan's Childhood, had an enormous impact on Parajanov's self-discovery as a filmmaker. Later the influence became mutual, and he and Tarkovsky became close friends. Another influence was Italian filmmaker Pier Paolo Pasolini, who Parajanov would later describe as "like a God" to him and a director of "majestic style". In 1965 Parajanov abandoned socialist realism and directed the poetic Shadows of Forgotten Ancestors, his first film over which he had complete creative control. It won numerous international awards and, unlike the subsequent The Color of Pomegranates, was relatively well received by the Soviet authorities. The Script Editorial Board at Goskino of Ukraine praised the film for "conveying the poetic quality and philosophical depth of M. Kotsiubynsky’s tale through the language of cinema," and called it "a brilliant creative success of the Dovzhenko studio." Moscow also agreed to Goskino of Ukraine's request to release the film with its original Ukrainian soundtrack intact, rather than redub the dialogue into Russian for Soviet-wide release, in order to preserve its Ukrainian flavor. (Russian dubbing was standard practice at that time for non-Russian Soviet films when they were distributed outside the republic of origin.)

Parajanov departed Kyiv shortly afterwards for his ancestors' homeland, Armenia. In 1969, he embarked on Sayat Nova, a film that many consider to be his crowning achievement, though it was shot under relatively poor conditions and had a very small budget. Soviet censors intervened and banned Sayat Nova for its allegedly inflammatory content. Parajanov re-edited his footage and renamed the film The Color of Pomegranates. Actor Alexei Korotyukov remarked: "Paradjanov made films not about how things are, but how they would have been had he been God." Mikhail Vartanov wrote in 1969 that "Besides the film language suggested by Griffith and Eisenstein, the world cinema has not discovered anything revolutionarily new until The Color of Pomegranates ...".

Imprisonment and later work

By December 1973, the Soviet authorities had grown increasingly suspicious of Parajanov's perceived subversive proclivities, particularly his bisexuality, and sentenced him to five years in a hard labor camp for "a rape of a Communist Party member, and the propagation of pornography." Three days before Parajanov was sentenced, Andrei Tarkovsky wrote a letter to the Central Committee of the Communist Party of Ukraine, asserting that "In the last ten years Sergei Paradjanov has made only two films: Shadows of Our Forgotten Ancestors and The Colour of Pomegranates. They have influenced cinema first in Ukraine, second in this country as a whole, and third in the world at large. Artistically, there are few people in the entire world who could replace Paradjanov. He is guilty – guilty of his solitude. We are guilty of not thinking of him daily and of failing to discover the significance of a master." An eclectic group of artists, actors, filmmakers and activists protested on behalf of Parajanov, calling for his immediate release. Among them were Robert De Niro, Francis Ford Coppola, Martin Scorsese, Leonid Gaidai, Eldar Ryazanov, Yves Saint Laurent, Marcello Mastroianni, Françoise Sagan, Jean-Luc Godard, François Truffaut, Luis Buñuel, Federico Fellini, Michelangelo Antonioni, Andrei Tarkovsky and Mikhail Vartanov.

Parajanov served four years out of his five-year sentence, and later credited his early release to the efforts of the French Surrealist poet and novelist Louis Aragon, the Russian poet Elsa Triolet (Aragon's wife), and the American writer John Updike. His early release was authorized by Leonid Brezhnev, General Secretary of the Communist Party of the Soviet Union, presumably as a consequence of Brezhnev's chance meeting with Aragon and Triolet at the Bolshoi Theatre in Moscow. When asked by Brezhnev if he could be of any assistance, Aragon requested the release of Parajanov, which was effected by December 1977.

While he was incarcerated, Parajanov produced a large number of miniature doll-like sculptures (some of which were lost) and some 800 drawings and collages, many of which were later displayed in Yerevan, where the Serhii Parajanov Museum is now permanently located. (The museum, opened in 1991, a year after Parajanov's death, hosts more than 200 works as well as furnishings from his home in Tbilisi.) His efforts in the camp were repeatedly compromised by prison guards, who deprived him of materials and called him mad, their cruelty only subsiding after a statement from Moscow admitted that "the director is very talented."

After his return from prison to Tbilisi, the close watch of Soviet censors prevented Parajanov from continuing his cinematic pursuits and steered him towards the artistic outlets he had nurtured during his time in prison. He crafted extraordinarily intricate collages, created a large collection of abstract drawings and pursued numerous other avenues of non-cinematic art, sewing more dolls and some whimsical suits.

In February 1982 Parajanov was once again imprisoned, on charges of bribery, which happened to coincide with his return to Moscow for the premiere of a play commemorating Vladimir Vysotsky at the Taganka Theatre, and was effected with some degree of trickery. Despite another stiff sentence, he was freed in less than a year, with his health seriously weakened.

In 1985, the slow thaw within the Soviet Union spurred Parajanov to resume his passion for cinema. With the encouragement of various Georgian intellectuals, he created the multi-award-winning film The Legend of Suram Fortress, based on a novella by Daniel Chonkadze, his first return to cinema since Sayat Nova fifteen years earlier. In 1988, Parajanov made another multi-award-winning film, Ashik Kerib, based on a story by Mikhail Lermontov. It is the story of a wandering minstrel, set in the Azerbaijani culture. Parajanov dedicated the film to his close friend Andrei Tarkovsky and "to all the children of the world".

Death
Parajanov then attempted to complete his final project. He died of cancer in Yerevan, Armenia on July 20, 1990, aged 66, leaving this final work, The Confession, unfinished. It survives in its original negative as Parajanov: The Last Spring, created by his close friend Mikhail Vartanov in 1992. Federico Fellini, Tonino Guerra, Francesco Rosi, Alberto Moravia, Giulietta Masina, Marcello Mastroianni and Bernardo Bertolucci were among those who publicly mourned his death. They sent a telegram to Russia with the following statement: "The world of cinema has lost a magician. Parajanov’s fantasy will forever fascinate and bring joy to the people of the world…”.

Influences and legacy

Despite having studied film at the VGIK, Parajanov discovered his artistic path only after seeing Soviet director Andrei Tarkovsky's dreamlike first film Ivan's Childhood.

Parajanov was highly appreciated by Tarkovsky himself in the biographical film "Voyage in Time" ("Always with huge gratitude and pleasure I remember the films of Sergei Parajanov which I love very much. His way of thinking, his paradoxical, poetical... ability to love the beauty and the ability to be absolutely free within his own vision"). In the same film Tarkovsky stated that Parajanov is one of his favorite filmmakers.

Italian filmmaker Michelangelo Antonioni stated that “The Color of Pomegranates by Parajanov, in my opinion one of the best contemporary film directors, strikes with its perfection of beauty.” Parajanov was also admired by American filmmaker Francis Ford Coppola. French film director Jean-Luc Godard also stated that "In the temple of cinema, there are images, light, and reality. Sergei Parajanov was the master of that temple".

Despite having many admirers of his art, his vision did not attract many followers. "Whoever tries to imitate me is lost", he reportedly said. However, directors such as Theo Angelopoulos, Béla Tarr and Mohsen Makhmalbaf share Parajanov's approach to film as a primarily visual medium rather than as a narrative tool.

The Parajanov-Vartanov Institute was established in Hollywood in 2010 to study, preserve and promote the artistic legacies of Sergei Parajanov and Mikhail Vartanov.

Filmography

Screenplays

Produced and partially produced screenplays
Shadows of Forgotten Ancestors (Тіні забутих предків, 1965, co-written with Ivan Chendei, based on the novelette by Mykhailo Kotsiubynsky)
Kyiv Frescoes (Київські фрески, 1965)
Sayat Nova (Саят-Нова, 1969, production screenplay of The Color of Pomegranates)
The Confession (сповідь, 1969–1989)
Studies About Vrubel (Этюды о Врубеле, 1989, depiction of Mikhail Vrubel's Kyiv period, co-written and directed by Leonid Osyka)
Swan Lake: The Zone (Лебедине озеро. Зона, 1989, filmed in 1990, directed by Yuriy Illienko, cinematographer of Shadows of Forgotten Ancestors)

Unproduced screenplays and projects
The Dormant Palace (Дремлющий дворец, 1969, based on Pushkin's poem The Fountain of Bakhchisaray)
Intermezzo (1972, based on Mykhailo Kotsiubynsky's short story)
Icarus (Икар, 1972)
The Golden Edge (Золотой обрез, 1972)
Ara the Beautiful (Ара Прекрасный, 1972, based on the poem by 20th century Armenian poet Nairi Zaryan about Ara the Beautiful)
Demon (Демон, 1972, based on Lermontov's eponymous poem)
The Miracle of Odense (Чудо в Оденсе, 1973, loosely based on the life and works of Hans Christian Andersen)
David of Sasun (Давид Сасунский, mid-1980s, based on Armenian epic poem David of Sasun)
The Martyrdom of Shushanik (Мученичество Шушаник, 1987, based on Georgian chronicle by Iakob Tsurtaveli)
The Treasures of Mount Ararat (Сокровища у горы Арарат)
Among his projects, there also were plans for adapting Longfellow's The Song of Hiawatha, Shakespeare's Hamlet, Goethe's Faust, the Old East Slavic poem The Tale of Igor's Campaign, but film scripts for these were never completed.

References in popular culture 
 Parajanov's life story provides (quite loosely) the basis for the 2006 novel Stet by the American author James Chapman.
 Lady Gaga's video for 911 visually references The Color of Pomegranates through much of the video. The film poster also appears on the street scene at the end of the video. Gaga's video presents the film's symbols in her own allegory of pain.
Madonna's 1995 music video Bedtime Story restages some content from the movie (such as the scene of a young child lying in a fetal position on a pentagram on the floor while an adult covers it with a blanket, and another where a naked foot crushes a bunch of grapes lying on an enscribed tablet), among other artistic inspiration depicting dreams and surrealist artwork in the video.
Nicolas Jaar released, in 2015, the album Pomegranates, intended as an alternative soundtrack for the movie.
It also infliuenced alternative rock group R.E.M.'s music video for "Losing My Religion".

Awards and recognition
 There is a statue of Parajanov in Tbilisi
 There is a plaque on the wall of Parajanov's childhood home
 The street Parajanov grew up on, Kote Meskhi street, was renamed Parajanov Street in 2021
 There is a house museum dedicated to Parajanov in Yerevan, Armenia

See also
 Art film
 Asteroid 3963 Paradzhanov
 Cinema of Armenia
 Cinema of Georgia
 Cinema of the Soviet Union
 Cinema of Ukraine
 Serhii Parajanov Museum
 List of directors associated with art film

Notes

References

Bibliography

Selected bibliography of books and scholarly articles about Sergei Parajanov.

English language sources

 Dixon, Wheeler & Foster, Gwendolyn. "A Short History of Film." New Brunswick, NJ: Rutgers University Press, 2008. 
 Cook, David A. "Shadows of Forgotten Ancestors: Film as Religious Art." Post Script 3, no. 3 (1984): 16–23.
 First, Joshua. Sergei Paradjanov: Shadows of Forgotten Ancestors. London and Chicago: Itellect; University of Chicago Press, 2016. 
 Nebesio, Bohdan. "Shadows of Forgotten Ancestors: Storytelling in the Novel and the Film." Literature/Film Quarterly 22, no. 1 (1994): 42–49.
 Oeler, Karla. "A Collective Interior Monologue: Sergei Parajanov and Eisenstein's Joyce-Inspired Vision of Cinema." The Modern Language Review 101, no. 2 (April 2006): 472–487.
 Oeler, Karla. "Nran guyne/The Colour of Pomegranates: Sergo Parajanov, USSR, 1969." In The Cinema of Russia and the Former Soviet Union, 139–148. London, England: Wallflower, 2006. [Book chapter]
 Papazian, Elizabeth A. "Ethnography, Fairytale and ‘Perpetual Motion’ in Sergei  Paradjanov's Ashik- Kerib." Literature/Film Quarterly 34, no. 4 (2006): 303–12.
 Paradjanov, Sergei. Seven Visions. Edited by Galia Ackerman. Translated by Guy Bennett. Los Angeles: Green Integer, 1998. , 
 Parajanov, Sergei, and Zaven Sarkisian. Parajanov Kaleidoscope: Drawings, Collages, Assemblages. Yerevan: Sergei Parajanov Museum, 2008. 
 Steffen, James. The Cinema of Sergei Parajanov. Madison: University of Wisconsin Press, 2013. 
 Steffen, James, ed. Sergei Parajanov special issue. Armenian Review 47/48, nos. 3–4/1–2 (2001/2002). Double issue; publisher website
 Steffen, James. "Kyiv Frescoes: Sergei Parajanov's Unrealized Film Project." KinoKultura Special Issue 9: Ukrainian Cinema (December 2009), online. URL: KinoKultura
 Schneider, Steven Jay. "501 Movie Directors." London: Hachette/Cassell, 2007.

Foreign language sources
 Bullot, Érik. Sayat Nova de Serguei Paradjanov: La face et le profil. Crisnée, Belgium: Éditions Yellow Now, 2007. (French language)  
 Cazals, Patrick. Serguei Paradjanov. Paris: Cahiers du cinéma, 1993. (French language) , 
 Chernenko, Miron. Sergei Paradzhanov: Tvorcheskii portret. Moskva: "Soiuzinformkino" Goskino SSSR, 1989. (Russian language) Online version
 Grigorian, Levon. Paradzhanov. Moscow: Molodaia gvardiia, 2011. (Russian language) , 
 Grigorian, Levon. Tri tsveta odnoi strasti: Triptikh Sergeia Paradzhanova. Moscow: Kinotsentr, 1991. (Russian language)
 Kalantar, Karen. Ocherki o Paradzhanove. Yerevan: Gitutiun NAN RA, 1998. (Russian language) 
 Katanian, Vasilii Vasil’evich. Paradzhanov: Tsena vechnogo prazdnika. Nizhnii Novgorod: Dekom, 2001. (Russian language) 
 Liehm, Antonín J., ed. Serghiej Paradjanov: Testimonianze e documenti su l’opera e la vita. Venice: La Biennale di Venezia/Marsilio, 1977. (Italian language) 
 Mechitov, Yuri. Sergei Paradzhanov: Khronika dialoga. Tbilisi: GAMS- print, 2009. (Russian language) 
 Paradzhanov, Sergei. Ispoved’. Edited by Kora Tsereteli. St. Petersburg: Azbuka, 2001. (Russian language) 
 Paradzhanov, Sergei, and Garegin Zakoian. Pis’ma iz zony. Yerevan: Fil’madaran, 2000. (Russian language) 
 Simyan, Tigran Sergei Parajanov as a Text: Man, Habitus, and Interior  (on the material of visual texts) // ΠΡΑΞΗMΑ. Journal of Visual Semiotics 2019, N 3, pp. 197–215
Schneider, Steven Jay. "501 Directores de Cine." Barcelona, Spain: Grijalbo, 2008. 
 Tsereteli, Kora, ed. Kollazh na fone avtoportreta: Zhizn’–igra. 2nd ed. Nizhnii Novgorod: Dekom, 2008. (Russian language) 
 Vartanov, Mikhail. "Sergej Paradzanov." In "Il Cinema Delle Repubbliche Transcaucasiche Sovietiche." Venice, Italy: Marsilio Editori, 1986. (Italian language) 
 Vartanov, Mikhail. "Les Cimes du Monde." Cahiers du Cinéma" no. 381, 1986 (French language)

External links 

 Official site (Parajanov.com)
 Sergej Parajanov Museum

 Hollywood Reporter
 Deadline Hollywood
 The Moscow Times
 ENCI.com
 The Parajanov Case, March 1982
 Sergei Parajanov's 75th birthday
 The Cinemaseekers Honor Roll
 Museum of Sergei Parajanov on GoYerevan.com
 Interview with Ron Holloway
 
 Actress Sofiko Chiaureli and many others about him
 Arts: Armenian Rhapsody
 Excerpted from "Paradjanov’s Films on Soviet Folklore" by Jonathan Rosenbaum
 For those who want to know more about Parajanov
 
 
 Evening Moscow Newspaper Spouses of Sergei Parajanov and Mikhail Vartanov received awards in Hollywood
 Sergei Parajanov. Collages. Graphics. Works of Decorative Art. Kyiv, 2008.

1924 births
1990 deaths
20th-century male artists
Armenian film directors
Bisexual men
Burials at the Komitas Pantheon
Deaths from cancer in the Soviet Union
Deaths from lung cancer
European Film Awards winners (people)
Armenian LGBT people
Film directors from Georgia (country)
Film people from Tbilisi
Gerasimov Institute of Cinematography alumni
LGBT film directors
People prosecuted under anti-homosexuality laws
Recipients of the Nika Award
Recipients of the Shevchenko National Prize
Soviet film directors
Soviet painters
20th-century LGBT people